Prison art is art that is created by persons who are imprisoned. 

Prison art is unique in several ways. Due to the low social status of prisoners, art made by prisoners has not historically been well-respected.  The art, much like the prisoners themselves, is often subject to controls. Art made by prisoners is sometimes valued, or conversely sometimes sought to be actively destroyed. Prisoners often lack common art supplies, and have been known to fashion supplies from materials at hand such as candy or instant coffee.

Examples of prison art

See also 

 Prison blogs
 Prison literature
 Prison music

References 

Visual arts genres